The 2011 Junior Club World Cup was the 1st Junior Club World Cup, an annual international ice hockey tournament. It took place between 30 August–3 September 2011 in Omsk, Russia.

Teams
The list of teams that have been confirmed for the tournament are as listed:

Group A
 Krasnaya Armiya (host)
 HK Rīga
 Tatranskí vlci
 EJHL All–Stars

Group B
 Dinamo-Shinnik
 Fort McMurray Oil Barons
 HC Energie Karlovy Vary
 Malmö Redhawks

Group stage

Key
W (regulation win) – 3 pts.
OTW (overtime/shootout win) – 2 pts.
OTL (overtime/shootout loss) – 1 pt.
L (regulation loss) – 0 pts.

Group A

Group B

Final Game

Statistics

Scoring leaders
List shows the top skaters sorted by points, then goals.

GP = Games played; G = Goals; A = Assists; Pts = Points; +/− = Plus/Minus; PIM = Penalties In Minutes; POS = Position
Source: mhl.khl.ru.com

Top Players
The following players were chosen as best in their position.

References

External links
 Official website

2011 in ice hockey
Junior Club World Cup
2011 in Russian sport
International ice hockey competitions hosted by Russia
Sport in Omsk